Zodwa Nsibande was the General Secretary of the Abahlali baseMjondolo youth league in 2009. She was critical of the impact of the FIFA 2010 World Cup on shack dwellers in Durban.

In 2006 she was badly burnt in a shack fire. In 2009 she had to go into hiding following threats and attacks against her and various other Abahlali baseMjondolo leaders.

Interviews with Zodwa Nsibande

 Reclaiming our dignity and voices, Sokari Ekine, Pambazuka, September 2009
 Interview with a South African housing activist about recent struggles in Durban. Simon Saunders, Morning Star, September 2009
 'Getting electricity was so exciting', The Guardian (UK), 2011

Articles by Zodwa Nsibande
 Serving our Life Sentence in the Shacks (with S'bu Zikode)

Online Films Featuring Zodwa Nsibande
 A Living Politics (in Howick) by Elkartasun Bideak, 2009
 From the Shacks to the Constitutional Court by Dara Kell & Christopher Nizza, 2008
 A Place in the City by Jenny Morgan, 2008
 Dear Mandela by Dara Kell & Christopher Nizza, 2008
 The Right to Know: The Fight for Open Democracy in South Africa by Ben Cashdan, 2007
 Breyani & the Councillor by Sally Gilles and Fazel Khan, 2006

External links
 Living Learning
 Experiences of Abahlali baseMjondolo in Durban, South Africa, A Report by Malavika Vartak for the Development Planning Unit of University College London

References

Living people
South African activists
South African women activists
Shack dwellers
Year of birth missing (living people)
21st-century squatters
Abahlali baseMjondolo members
Housing in South Africa